Star Breeze (formerly Seabourn Spirit) is a German-built cruise ship completed in 1989. The luxury liner travels between Europe and Africa, and is owned by Windstar Cruises. In early 2005 she was rated the best small cruise ship by Condé Nast. In April 2015, she departed the Seabourn fleet, and on 6 May 2015 she was rechristened and entered service with Windstar Cruises.

Pirate attack

On 5November 2005 at 5:50a.m., while Spirit was underway 115km off the coast of Somalia with 115 passengers, the ship was attacked by two pirate speedboats launched by a mother ship. Machine guns were fired as well as rocket-propelled grenades at the cruise ship, and the remains of an RPG's rocket motor wedged itself in the wall of a room and was disarmed by sailors from  after the attack. It was reported that a second RPG bounced off the stern. No passengers were injured, but the ship's master-at-arms, Som Bahadur Gurung was hit by shrapnel whilst attempting to combat the raiders with a Long Range Acoustic Device (LRAD). The sonic device repelled the pirates by blasting a powerful sound wave.

Security officer Michael Groves and British shipmate Som Bahadur Gurung (an ex-Gurkha) were honoured for their bravery by Queen Elizabeth II at Buckingham Palace on Wednesday 16May 2007, receiving the Queen's Gallantry Medal and the Queen's Commendation for Bravery, respectively.

The ship then altered its course to Port Victoria in the Seychelles for repairs rather than the originally planned Mombasa in Kenya. The ship then sailed to Singapore and returned to its original schedule.

Later service
In 2019, the vessel was "stretched". It was cut in half and a new 84-foot section was inserted in the middle, with 50 new staterooms, accommodating 100 extra passengers. She debuted in February 2020.

References

External links

Official website

1988 ships
Maritime incidents in 2005
Conflicts in 2005
Ships of Seabourn Cruise Line
Ships built in Bremen (state)
Piracy in Somalia